Mohamed Messaoud (born November 19, 1981) is an Algerian professional footballer who plays as an attacking midfielder or forward.  at the club  RC Boumerdes

Messaoud finished twice as the top scorer of the Algerian Ligue Professionnelle 1 in 2008–09 and 2011–12. In 2011, he was a member of the Algeria A' national football team that finished fourth at the 2011 African Nations Championship in Sudan.

Club career
Messaoud was born in Tiaret, Algeria. On November 2, 2012, he reached the 100 goal milestone in the Algerian Ligue Professionnelle 1 with a goal against CA Batna in the ninth round of the 2012–13 Algerian Ligue Professionnelle 1 season.

International career
On May 21, 2009, Messaoud was called up as a reserve player to the Algerian national team for its qualifiers against Egypt and Zambia.

Honours

Club
ASO Chlef
 Algerian Cup: 2004–05
 Algerian Ligue Professionnelle 1: 2010–11

Individual
 Two time Top scorer of the Algerian Ligue Professionnelle 1 twice in 2008–09 (19 goals) and 2011–12 (15 goals)

References

1981 births
Living people
People from Tiaret
Association football forwards
Association football midfielders
Algerian footballers
MC Oran players
CR Belouizdad players
ASO Chlef players
Algerian Ligue Professionnelle 1 players
Algeria A' international footballers
USM Annaba players
Algeria under-23 international footballers
2011 African Nations Championship players
JSM Tiaret players
21st-century Algerian people